The River Peck is a small stream in London that was enclosed in 1823. The stream daylights on the west side of Peckham Rye Park.

In South Bermondsey it flows into the Earl's Sluice which has its confluence with the Thames at Deptford Wharf. Peckham means "homestead of the Peck".

See also
Subterranean rivers of London

References

External links
Lost Rivers from Above: The Peck on Londonist blog.
River Peck on Diamond Geezer blog.

Rivers of London
Subterranean rivers of London
Geography of the London Borough of Southwark